Robert Wayne "Bob" Burcham, Sr. (August 22, 1935 – April 10, 2009) was a NASCAR Winston Cup Series driver whose career spanned from 1968 to 1979. His primary ride was the No. 19 Belden Asphalt-sponsored Chevrolet of Henley Gray. Jack White was Burcham's other employer in NASCAR.

Career
His parents were Robert "Bobby" and Opal Burcham; they lived near the interstate border that divided Georgia and Tennessee. Burcham's father was an automobile repair shop operator and Bob learned the secrets of the trade from him. Amazingly enough, Burcham's first Winston Cup Series ride was with a 1973 Chevrolet Chevelle; which saw some action at Daytona International Speedway and a few other race tracks. Most of his "top ten" finishes were in the 1974 Winston Cup Series season. A fourth-place finish in Nashville during the 1974 season was his best finish. After NASCAR, Burcham was self-employed in real estate. A total amount of $65,578 in total earnings ($ when adjusted for inflation) was earned by Burcham after starting an average of 25th place and finishing an average of 20th place in his NASCAR Cup Series career.

He has a widow named Jean Knight Burcham in addition to his married daughter Vickie Jean and his son Bobby Burcham, Jr. In 2009, Burcham was elected into the Georgia Racing Hall of Fame.

References

External links
 

1935 births
2009 deaths
NASCAR drivers
People from Rossville, Georgia
Racing drivers from Georgia (U.S. state)